Ian A. Krol (born May 9, 1991) is an American professional baseball pitcher for the Tecolotes de los Dos Laredos of the Mexican League. He has played in Major League Baseball (MLB) for the Washington Nationals, Atlanta Braves, Los Angeles Angels and Detroit Tigers and in Nippon Professional Baseball (NPB) for the Yomiuri Giants.

Professional career

Oakland Athletics
Krol was drafted by the Oakland Athletics in the seventh round of the 2009 Major League Baseball Draft out of Neuqua Valley High School in Naperville, Illinois. He was selected despite not pitching in his senior year due to being suspended for the entire season for an alcohol-related offense, his second violation of the district athletic code of conduct (his first violation, in his junior year, led to a seven-game suspension).

After missing time due to an elbow injury, Krol made his professional debut on August 27, starting for the AZL Athletics. After that, he made three appearances (one start) with the Low-A Vancouver Canadians. Krol played most of 2010 with Single-A Kane County Cougars, where in 24 games (23 starts), he went 9–4 with a 2.65 ERA, striking out 91 in 118 innings, and was a mid and post-season all-star. He also made four starts for High-A Stockton at the end of the year, going 1–0. Krol missed the first three months with an elbow injury, and was pitching in a rehab assignment in the Arizona League before he was suspended for the rest of the season—more than two months—for a tweet that included a graphic "gay slur along with some other offensive language".

Krol began 2012 with the Ports as a starter, where in 15 starts, he went 1–7 with a 5.62 ERA. In late July, he was moved to the bullpen to reduce his projected innings pitched total. He performed well in that role, earning a promotion to the Double-A Midland RockHounds. In 29 combined appearances (15 starts), he went 2–9 with a 5.20 ERA, striking out 89 batters in 97 innings.

Washington Nationals
Krol was acquired by the Washington Nationals in March 2013 as a player to be named later in the trade that sent Michael Morse to the Seattle Mariners, John Jaso to Oakland, and A. J. Cole and Blake Treinen to the Nationals. He was assigned to Double-A Harrisburg to begin the year, where he got off to a hot start. In 21 games with the Senators, he had a 0.69 ERA, striking out 29 in 26 innings.

He was called up to the majors for the first time on June 4, 2013. He made his major league debut the next day against the Mets, striking out the side in one scoreless inning of work. After a short stint with the Triple-A Syracuse Chiefs at the end of August, Krol returned to the Nationals for September. In 32 games with Washington, he went 2–1 with two holds and a 3.95 ERA, striking out 22 in 27 innings.

Detroit Tigers

On December 2, 2013, Krol was traded to the Detroit Tigers, along with infielder Steve Lombardozzi and pitcher Robbie Ray, for starting pitcher Doug Fister. On July 31, 2014, Krol was optioned to the Tigers AAA affiliate, the Toledo Mud Hens. He was called up by the Tigers on September 8, 2015 as a September call-up. In 33 games with Detroit, Krol went 2–3 with a 5.79 ERA and 26 strikeouts in 28 innings.

Atlanta Braves
On November 20, 2015, the Tigers traded Krol and pitcher Gabe Speier to the Atlanta Braves in exchange for outfielder Cameron Maybin and cash considerations. He was invited to spring training, and sent down to begin the 2016 season with the Triple A Gwinnett Braves.

Los Angeles Angels
On February 6, 2018, Krol signed a minor league deal with the Los Angeles Angels.  He made one appearance for the Major League club, pitching two innings on May 27th. The following day, May 28th, he was designated for assignment, he requested and received his release on May 31.

New York Mets
Krol signed a minor league contract with the New York Mets on June 10, 2018. He was released by the organization on September 2, 2018.

Cincinnati Reds
On January 29, 2019, Krol signed a minor league contract with the Cincinnati Reds that included an invitation to spring training.

Minnesota Twins
On June 18, 2019, Krol signed a minor league deal with the Minnesota Twins. On August 16, 2019, Krol was suspended 50 games for his second positive test for a drug of abuse. He became a free agent following the 2019 season.

Second Stint with Detroit Tigers
On December 14, 2020, Krol signed a minor-league contract with the Detroit Tigers with an invitation to spring training. He was assigned to the Triple-A Toledo Mud Hens to begin the 2021 season. In 17 games with Toledo, Krol logged a 2.42 ERA with 26 strikeouts. On July 7, 2021, Krol was selected to the major league roster. In 5 appearances for the Tigers, Krol posted a 3.86 ERA with 4 strikeouts. On July 27, Krol was designated for assignment by the Tigers. Krol cleared waivers and was outrighted to the Mud Hens two days later. On July 30, 2021, Krol's contract was again purchased from Toledo after the trade of Daniel Norris. In another 7 appearances for Detroit, Krol recorded a 5.87 ERA with 6 strikeouts. On August 27, Krol was designated for assignment once again, as the Tigers activated José Ureña from the injured list. On August 30, Krol cleared waivers and was assigned outright to Triple-A Toledo. On September 11, Krol was re-selected to the active roster. On November 5, Krol was outrighted off of the 40-man roster and elected free agency.

San Diego Padres
On March 18, 2022, Krol signed a minor league contract with the San Diego Padres, which includes an invitation to spring training. He was released on June 16, 2022.

Yomiuri Giants
On July 19, 2022, Krol signed with the Yomiuri Giants of Nippon Professional Baseball. Krol made 21 appearances for the main team down the stretch, pitching to a 1-1 record and 3.86 ERA with 15 strikeouts in 21.0 innings of work. He became a free agent following the 2022 season.

Tecolotes de los Dos Laredos
On March 6, 2023, Krol signed with the Tecolotes de los Dos Laredos of the Mexican League.

Pitch selection
Krol throws four pitches. He has a four-seam fastball in the 93–95 MPH range, a cut fastball between 88–90 MPH, a curveball between 77–79 MPH, and an above-average changeup averaging 83–85 MPH.

References

External links

1991 births
Living people
American expatriate baseball players in Canada
Arizona League Athletics players
Atlanta Braves players
Baseball players from Illinois
Detroit Tigers players
Florida Fire Frogs players
Gulf Coast Braves players
Gwinnett Braves players
Harrisburg Senators players
Kane County Cougars players
Las Vegas 51s players
Los Angeles Angels players
Louisville Bats players
Major League Baseball pitchers
Midland RockHounds players
People from Hinsdale, Illinois
Rochester Red Wings players
Salt Lake Bees players
Stockton Ports players
Syracuse Chiefs players
Toledo Mud Hens players
Vancouver Canadians players
Washington Nationals players
West Michigan Whitecaps players
Yomiuri Giants players